Balbriggan railway station serves Balbriggan in County Dublin.

It is the northern limit of the Dublin suburban rail network and the short hop zone. Due to a growing population, planning permission has been submitted to increase the capacity of the station.

History
The station opened on 25 May 1844. It was opened by the Dublin and Drogheda Railway, then run by the Great Northern Railway (Ireland) until 1950.  The GNR(I) was then taken over by the Irish and Northern Irish Governments and was run through the Railway Board until 1958. Upon the dissolution of the GNRB those portions of the former GNR(I) within the Irish Republic passed to the Córas Iompair Éireann. The station closed for goods traffic on Monday 2 December 1974.

Description and viaduct 
The station has two lines which run through Balbriggan. A viaduct is nearby and can be viewed by a walkway on either side. The right side of the walkway (the railway side) can be entered by stairs at Balbriggan Beach. The left side (the walking side) can be entered by a path on the public road. The road to the viaduct is Quay Street. The station currently has 2 platforms, platform 1 has yellow lines, a ticket vending machine with turnstiles and can be entered by the main station house. Platform 2 has to be entered by a bridge over the tracks and also has yellow lines. Each platform has real time information screens based on the progress of trains. The platforms have loudspeakers to make announcements. It is located on the Dublin to Belfast railway line. It is a stop for some commuter services and sometimes a terminus. An Enterprise may pass by hourly running fast through the station or some Tara Mine freight trains at some times also run through the station

See also
 List of railway stations in Ireland

References

External links 

 Irish Rail Balbriggan Station Website
 Eiretrains - Balbriggan Station

Iarnród Éireann stations in Fingal
Railway stations in Fingal
Railway stations in the Republic of Ireland opened in 1844